Christopher Olsen is an American former child actor.

Olsen is perhaps best known as the kidnapped boy Hank McKenna in The Man Who Knew Too Much. Other roles include The Fastest Gun Alive, with Glenn Ford; Return to Warbow, with Phil Carey; James Mason's son in Bigger Than Life; and Dorothy Malone's son, Jack Shumann, in The Tarnished Angels.

He also appeared in numerous television series episodes, including Cheyenne, Lassie, The Millionaire, Make Room for Daddy, and The Adventures of Ozzie and Harriet.

Personal life
Olsen was born in Los Angeles, California to Lawernece Olsen and DeLoise Olsen at Saint Vincent's Hospital. He has been married to Patricia Taulbee since December 6, 1980. They have one child.

His youngest sister is Susan Olsen of The Brady Bunch fame, and his older brother, Larry, played the title character in the Hal Roach comedy, Curley.

Filmography
Crashout (1955)  as Timmy Mosher
Bigger Than Life (1956) as Richie Avery
The Man Who Knew Too Much (1956) as Henry "Hank" McKenna
The Fastest Gun Alive (1956) as Bobby Tibbs
The Tall T (1957) as Jeff
The Tarnished Angels (1957) as Jack Shumann
Return to Warbow (1958) as David Fallam

References

External links

1946 births
Living people
Male actors from Los Angeles
American male child actors